Capel Street   is a street in Dublin, Ireland. On 20 May 2022, it was made traffic-free, following a campaign by people who wanted to improve the quality of life on the street. It is now the longest traffic-free street in Dublin.

History

Capel Street is named after Arthur Capell, 1st Earl of Essex, Lord Lieutenant of Ireland 1672–1677. Historically, it was the site of the chapel of St Mary's Abbey. The street was laid out by Sir Humphrey Jervis in the late 17th century on the Abbey lands he purchased in 1674. He also built Essex Bridge (today Grattan Bridge), and the street was known for its mansions and a royal mint. In the 18th century, it became a commercial hub, with two-bay buildings replacing most of the "Dutch Billy" houses. In the late 1700s, the Italian composer, Tommaso Giordani, performed at a small purpose built theatre on the street. The Capel Street Theatre also stood there in the 18th century.

The Torch Theatre operated on Capel Street from 1935–41. The street declined in the 20th century, before a revival around the 1980s. Today it is known for its variety of restaurants, shops, cafés and pubs; as Panti, the owner of Pantibar put it, "You can buy a lightbulb, sexual lubricant, Brazilian rice, get a pint and go to a trad session". Louis Copeland's tailor is another notable business.

Architecture
The street affords a vista all the way from the junction with Bolton Street south through Parliament Street to Dublin's City Hall. Capel Street is notable for the remains of some "Dutch Billy" houses dating from the 18th century.

Gallery

See also

List of streets and squares in Dublin

References

External links
Archiseek page on Capel Street

Streets in Dublin (city)
Abbey Street